The 1986 Coppa Kouros was the opening round of the 1986 World Sports-Prototype Championship.  It took place at the Autodromo Nazionale Monza, Italy on April 20, 1986.

Official results
Class winners in bold.  Cars failing to complete 75% of the winner's distance marked as Not Classified (NC).

Statistics
 Pole Position - #4 Martini Racing - 1:32.320
 Fastest Lap - #4 Martini Racing - 1:36.960
 Average Speed - 201.746 km/h

References

 
 

Monza
Monza
6 Hours of Monza